
Gmina Dukla is an urban-rural gmina (administrative district) in Krosno County, Subcarpathian Voivodeship, in south-eastern Poland, on the Slovak border.

As of 1 January 2010, part of the gmina was separated to form the new Gmina Jaśliska.

Villages
Apart from the town of Dukla, Gmina Dukla contains the villages and settlements of Barwinek, Cergowa, Chyrowa, Głojsce, Iwla, Jasionka, Łęki Dukielskie, Lipowica, Mszana, Myszkowskie, Nadole, Nowa Wieś, Olchowiec, Ropianka, Równe, Smereczne, Teodorówka, Trzciana, Tylawa, Wietrzno, Wilsznia, Zawadka Rymanowska, Zboiska and Zyndranowa.

Neighbouring gminas
Gmina Dukla is bordered by the gminas of Chorkówka, Iwonicz-Zdrój, Jaśliska, Krempna, Miejsce Piastowe, Nowy Żmigród and Rymanów. It also borders Slovakia.

References
Polish official population figures 2006

Dukla
Krosno County